The 2018 Men's U23 Pan-American Volleyball Cup was the fourth edition of the bi-annual men's volleyball tournament, played by five countries from 15 to 20 October at the Domo Polideportivo in Guatemala City, Guatemala.

Competing nations

Pool standing procedure
Match won 3–0: 5 points for the winner, 0 point for the loser
Match won 3–1: 4 points for the winner, 1 points for the loser
Match won 3–2: 3 points for the winner, 2 points for the loser
The first criterion is the number of matches won, second criterion is points gained by the team
In case of tie, the teams were classified according to the following criteria:
points ratio and sets ratio

Competition format
The competition format for the 2018 Men's U23 Pan-American Volleyball Cup consists of two phases, the first is a round robin round between all five competing nations. After the round robin finishes, 3rd and 4th place nations according to ranking will play for the bronze and 1st and 2nd place nations according to ranking will play for the gold.

Round robin
 All times are Central Time Zone (UTC−06:00)

Finals

Third place match

Final

Final standing

Individual awards

Most Valuable Player

Best Scorer

Best Spikers

Best Middle Blocker

Best Setter

Best Opposite

Best Libero

Best Digger

Best Receiver

Best Server

References

Men's Pan-American Volleyball Cup
Men's U23 Pan-American Volleyball Cup
Men's U23 Pan-American Volleyball Cup
2012 Men's U23 Pan-American Volleyball Cup